Bohle Plains is a locality in Townsville in the City of Townsville, Queensland, Australia. In the  Bohle Plains had a population of 3,205 people.

History
Bohle Plains is situated in the traditional Wulgurukaba Aboriginal country.

The name Bohle Plains comes from the nearby Bohle River, which in turn takes its name from Henry Mackinnon Bohle, who brought cattle to the area in 1863.

In the  Bohle Plains had a population of 3,205 people.

Geography
The Hervey Range Developmental Road runs through from south-east to south-west, passing under and linking to the Bruce Highway, which runs through from south-east to north-west.

Education
There are no schools in Bohle Plains. The nearest government primary schools are The Willows State School in neighbouring Kirwan to the east and Bohlevale State School in neighbouring Derragun to the north. The nearest government secondary schools are Thuringowa State High School in neighbouring  Condon to the south-east, Kirwan State High School in Kirwan, and Northern Beaches State High School in Derragun.

Amenities
There are a number of parks in the area:

 Mannikin Way Park
 Needletail Way Park

Amenities
There are a number of parks in the area:

 Mannikin Way Park
 Needletail Way Park

Amenities
There are a number of parks in the suburb, including:

 Mannikin Way Park
 Needletail Way Park

References

External links
 

Suburbs of Townsville
Localities in Queensland